Route 317, or Highway 317, may refer to:

Canada
Manitoba Provincial Road 317
Prince Edward Island Route 317
 Quebec Route 317
Saskatchewan Highway 317

China
 China National Highway 317

Costa Rica
 National Route 317

India
 National Highway 317 (India)

Japan
 Japan National Route 317

United States
  Colorado State Highway 317
  Connecticut Route 317
  Georgia State Route 317
  Louisiana Highway 317
  Maryland Route 317
  Minnesota State Highway 317
  Nevada State Route 317
  New Mexico State Road 317
 New York:
  New York State Route 317 (disambiguation)
  County Route 317 (Erie County, New York)
  Ohio State Route 317
  Pennsylvania Route 317
  Puerto Rico Highway 317
  Tennessee State Route 317
 Texas:
  Texas State Highway 317
  Texas State Highway Spur 317
  Farm to Market Road 317
  Utah State Route 317
  Virginia State Route 317 (former)
  Wyoming Highway 317